Robert Dunkley (born 13 January 1949) is a Bahamian sailor. He competed in the Laser event at the 1996 Summer Olympics.

References

External links
 

1949 births
Living people
Bahamian male sailors (sport)
Olympic sailors of the Bahamas
Sailors at the 1996 Summer Olympics – Laser
Place of birth missing (living people)
Bishop's University alumni
Snipe class sailors